By any means necessary is a translation of a phrase used by Martinican intellectual Frantz Fanon in his 1960 Address to the Accra Positive Action Conference, "Why we use violence". The phrase had also been used by French intellectual Jean-Paul Sartre in his play Dirty Hands in 1948. Later, it entered the popular civil rights culture through a speech given by Malcolm X at the Organization of Afro-American Unity founding rally on June 28, 1964. It is generally considered to leave open all available tactics for the desired ends, including violence.

Frantz Fanon 
The phrase is a translation of a sentence used in revolutionary psychiatrist and philosopher Frantz Fanon's 1960 Address to the Accra Positive Action Conference, "Why we use violence": Violence in everyday behaviour, violence against the past that is emptied of all substance, violence against the future, for the colonial regime presents itself as necessarily eternal. We see, therefore, that the colonized people, caught in a web of a three-dimensional violence, a meeting point of multiple, diverse, repeated, cumulative violences, are soon logically confronted by the problem of ending the colonial regime by any means necessary.

—Frantz Fanon, Alienation and Freedom: part 3, chapter 22, "Why we use violence". 1960

Jean-Paul Sartre 

The phrase is a translation of a sentence used in French intellectual Jean-Paul Sartre's 1948 play Dirty Hands:

Malcolm X 

It entered the popular culture through a speech given by Malcolm X in the last year of his life.

Mandela recusal 

In the final scene of the 1992 movie Malcolm X, Nelson Mandela—then recently released after 27 years of political imprisonment—appears as a schoolteacher in a Soweto classroom reciting Malcolm X's speech. Yet Mandela informed director Spike Lee that he could not utter the famous final phrase "by any means necessary" on camera, fearing that the apartheid government would use it against him if he did. Lee obliged, and the final seconds of the film feature black-and-white footage of Malcolm X himself delivering the phrase.

See also 
The end justifies the means
By hook or by crook
Nation of domination

References 

Political violence
Political catchphrases
Malcolm X